In Canada, the 1952 Governor General's Awards for Literary Merit were the sixteenth such awards.  The awards in this period had no monetary prize and were just an honour for the authors.

Winners
Fiction: David Walker, The Pillar.
Poetry or Drama: E. J. Pratt, Towards the Last Spike.
Non-Fiction: Bruce Hutchison, The Incredible Canadian.
Non-Fiction: Donald G. Creighton, John A. Macdonald, The Young Politician.
Juvenile: Marie McPhedran, Cargoes on the Great Lakes.

External links
 

Governor General's Awards, 1952
Governor General's Awards, 1952
Governor General's Awards